Olivier Léo Patrick Alexandre Michaud (born September 14, 1983) is a Canadian retired professional ice hockey goaltender.

Biography
Michaud was born in Beloeil, Quebec. As a youth, he played in the 1997 Quebec International Pee-Wee Hockey Tournament with the Richelieu Laser minor ice hockey team.

Michaud played one game in the National Hockey League (NHL) with the Montreal Canadiens during the 2001–02 NHL season. His appearance was due to the loss of Jose Theodore and backup Jeff Hackett to injury, and Michaud became an emergency call-up from his junior team to back up third-string Mathieu Garon. Michaud relieved Garon for one period, making 14 saves in 18 minutes of action while not giving up a goal. This appearance made him the youngest player to ever tend goal for the Canadiens and second-youngest goaltender to play in the NHL. He resides in Montreal, where he operates a goaltending school, Ecole de Gardiens de But Olivier Michaud.

References

External links

1983 births
Baie-Comeau Drakkar players
Canadian ice hockey goaltenders
Columbus Cottonmouths (ECHL) players
Hamilton Bulldogs (AHL) players
Ice hockey people from Quebec
Living people
Long Beach Ice Dogs (ECHL) players
Montreal Canadiens players
People from Montérégie
Shawinigan Cataractes players
Undrafted National Hockey League players